This is a list of United States National Parks by elevation. Most of America's national parks are located in mountainous areas. Even among those located close to the ocean, not all are flat. Those few that are low-lying preserve important natural habitats that could never exist at high altitude. Several national parks protect deep canyons with great vertical relief. There are also three national parks whose primary features are caves, the depths of which are still being explored.

Highest and lowest points in each US National Park
Criteria: Points on this list are the highest and lowest points within each national park and its associated national preserve, if it has one. It does not include adjacent or associated national recreation areas, parkways, memorials, or forests, but does include private property within park boundaries. Footnotes are given to mention other notable high or low points, when appropriate.

Selected Profiles
 The AT thru the Smokeys – The Appalachian Trail crosses through Great Smokey Mountains and Shenandoah National Parks. It reaches its highest point at Clingmans Dome.
 Skyline Drive map and profile – Skyline Drive runs the length of Shenandoah.
 PCT Elevation Profiles – The Pacific Crest Trail goes through seven national parks.
North Cascades – Washington section K
Mount Rainier – Washington section I
Crater Lake – Oregon section C
Lassen Volcanic – California section N
Yosemite – California sections H & I
Kings Canyon – California section H
Sequoia – California sections G & H
  Wonderland Trail – An elevation profile of the Wonderland Trail around Mount Rainier.

See also
 List of U.S. states and territories by elevation

References

External links
 National Park Service
 Peakbagger 
 www.climb.mountains.com These two external lists may not necessarily agree 100% with Wikipedia's list, but serve as useful comparisons. The primary difference is that these lists do not include associated national preserves.
 Postholer Maps; contains clear, zoomable topographic maps of the entire USA.

 
Elevation
National Parks
U.S. National Parks

es:Parques nacionales de Estados Unidos